

The Kraft K-1 Super Fli is a single-seat sport aircraft that was designed in the United States in the early 1970s and marketed for homebuilding. It is a low-wing cantilever monoplane of conventional design with fixed, tailwheel undercarriage. The wings have a wooden structure, skinned in plywood, while the fuselage and empennage are built from steel tube, the fuselage skinned in aluminium and the tail in fabric.  It has a very similar design to radio controlled craft.

The Super Fli's designer, Phil Kraft, was a champion builder and flier of radio-controlled model aircraft who in 1972 decided to apply this expertise to the design of a full-size aircraft. The design therefore reflected guidelines normally applied to model aircraft, particularly in its wing design, areas, and moments. Kraft also designed a scale model of course, which was published in Model Airplane News and was later kitted by Bridi and Great Planes. Plans for the model remain available from MAN.

Specifications

References
 
 

1970s United States sport aircraft
Homebuilt aircraft
Aerobatic aircraft
Low-wing aircraft
Aircraft first flown in 1974